Archibald Adam Warden (11 May 1869 in Edinburgh, Scotland – October 1943 in Cannes, Vichy France) was a British tennis player who competed in the 1900 Summer Olympics.

In 1900 he won a bronze medal in mixed doubles event with Hedwiga Rosenbaumová of Bohemia.

References

External links
 
profile

1869 births
1943 deaths
19th-century British people
19th-century male tennis players
British male tennis players
Olympic bronze medallists for Great Britain
Olympic tennis players of Great Britain
Tennis players at the 1900 Summer Olympics
Olympic medalists in tennis
Medalists at the 1900 Summer Olympics
Place of birth missing